Jack Robert Winslade (born 12 April 1995) is an English cricketer who played for Surrey. He is an all-rounder who bats right-handed and bowls right-arm medium-fast. He made his debut for the county in the 2014 Royal London One-Day Cup against Durham.

Winslade was released by Surrey at the end of the 2014 season. He joined Essex and made his first-class debut against Derbyshire on 9 September 2015.

References

External links
 

1995 births
Living people
Cricketers from Epsom
English cricketers of the 21st century
English cricketers
Essex cricketers
Surrey cricketers